Cec Drummond (1916-1975) was an Australian professional soccer player who played as a full-back for the Australia national soccer team.

Early life
Drummond was raised in Sydney.

International career
Drummond played for the Australia national soccer team, and played 14 official matches, making his debut against South Africa and being captained four times.

Career statistics

International

References

Australian soccer players
Association football defenders
Australia international soccer players
1916 births
1975 deaths